Shaike Levi (born December 13, 1939) is an Israeli comedian, singer and actor. He is best known for his role in the Gashash HaHiver (HaGashash HaHiver) comedy trio, which won the Israel Prize in 2000.

Biography
Yeshayahu (Shaike) Levy was born in Cairo, Egypt to Mazal and Moshe Levy. He left Egypt with his mother in 1944, after the death of his father. The family settled in Tel Aviv but Levi spent his adolescent years in Kibbutz Ein Hayam and later  Givat Brenner. In 1956-1957 he led the singing group the "Givat Brenner Foursome" alongside Daniel Vardon.

Entertainment career
During his military service, Levy served in the IDF troupe at the Gadna and then at the Central Command Troupe. Shortly after his discharge in 1960, he joined the band "The Small Hours Club" in Safed. Levi was accepted to the Cameri Theater and played a small role in a play called "The Twelfth Night" but when Naomi Polani constructed HaTarnegolim ( lit. The Roosters) band, Levi preferred it over the Cameri. Levy says that he hadn't studied acting or voice coaching and that Naomi Polani was like a school to the group.

In 1962 Levy acted in his first movie role as an 'enemy pilot' in the film Sinaia, which was based on an actual event from the Suez Crisis where a Bedouin baby was brought to Israel by an army medic after her mother had been accidentally injured by Israeli forces during the fighting.  Following military service in entertainment units, Levi joined HaTarnegolim and afterwards joined the HaGashash HaHiver trio in late 1963. The team staged ll comedy acts and participated in ll films along with numerous festivals, musical recordings, and television performances during a time span of 40 years.

From 1993 to 1999 Levy headed EMI (Artists of Israel) and in 1996 he came out with a biographical book titled Sipurim Im Rotev ( lit. 'Stories With Sauce'), which included songs and cooking recipes. In 1999 he released his first solo album, "Shaike Levi."

Between 2003-2006 Levy portrayed Elvis Ben-David in Israeli productions based on the adaptation of the Mexican telenovela El Amor no es como lo pintan ("Love is Not as They Paint It") and also appeared in a solo stage act (Yeshayahu Chapter 2) and participated in a children's musical tape (Bamboni Ein Kamoni).

HaGashash HaHiver 
In late 1963 Levy left The Roosters – together with two other "Roosters", Gavri Banai and Yisrael Poliakov – at the request of Avraham Deshe (Pashanel), in order to start the Gashash HaHiver trio. Levi recollects the success of the Gesher HaYarkon trio and that, while they were not certain that they could duplicate the success of the Tarnegolim, Pashanel was sure and paid their salaries throughout the long preparation months.

Their first act, titled Simhat Zkenti (slang for "[makes] my old lady happy") was more successful than anticipated with 350 performances across Israel by the end of 1965. The show, which was very Mizrahit in nature, had an initial unresponsive welcome by the kibbutz movement. Levi recalls Shaike Ophir being strict on the group emphasizing every 'Heth' ('') and 'Ayin' ('') like he would and attributes their acceptance by the kibbutzim to their director Nisim Aloni.

In 1964 Levy performed in Ephraim Kishon's critically acclaimed film Sallah Shabati alongside Chaim Topol, Gila Almagor, Zaharira Harifai, and Arik Einstein. The film was a satirical portrayal of the poor conditions and the integration of the Jewish refugees from Arab lands living in the maabara. In 1967, Levi also played in another Kishon film – Ervinka (about an incorrigible layabout who becomes involved in the robbery of the Israeli lottery under cover of making a documentary.

Late 1960s
Between 1966–1970, Levy made four films under Uri Zohar together with  Gavri Banai and Yisrael Poliakov: Moishe Ventilator (1966) (also 'Moishe Air-Condition'), a parody featuring Yaakov Bodo, Shaike Ophir, and Uri Zohar about a frugal private whose money-saving ideas include cutting maps in the operation room; HaShehuna Shelanu (1968) (lit. 'Our Neighborhood', also 'Fish, Football, and Girls'), a bourekas film with  Shaike Ophir, Gabi Amrani, Yona Atari, Tsippi Shavit, and Gadi Yagil among others; Kol Mamzer Melekh (1968) (lit. 'Every Bastard is King') with Yehoram Gaon as a chatty driver who gets entangled in the Six Day War and ends up stopping an Egyptian armored division by himself; and Hitromamut (1970) (also 'Takeoff'), which depicted three married men who fulfil a sexual fantasy but quickly turn to envious and guilty feelings. During this time the "Gashash" also participated in Menahem Golan's melodrama film Fortuna (1966) (also 'The Girl from the Dead Sea'), which starred French actor Pierre Brasseur and also in Rafi Nusbaum's film HaMatara Tiran (1968) (lit 'Objective Tiran') about a group of soldiers whose mission is to destroy a Soviet radar station in the Straits of Tiran.

Film career
Between 1976–1986 the Gashash HaHiver performed in three Assi Dayan films: the a cult movie Givat Halfon Eina Ona (1976) (lit. 'Halfon Hill Doesn't Answer'), a satire about an army reserves company observing the Egyptian border in Sinai; Shlager (1979) (also 'The Hit'), a musical comedy which featured The Frekha Song (written by Assi Dayan, composed by Tzvika Pik and sung by Ofra Haza); HaKrav Al HaVaad (1986) (also 'Battle of the Chairmanship' or 'House Committee Rivalry'), a humorous depiction of Israeli politics taking place in a condominium. During these years, Levi performed in two other films: Hamesh Meot Ellef Shachor (1977) (lit. 'Five Hundred Thousand Black'), starring Ze'ev Revach, Jacques Cohen, and Yosef Shiloah and directed by Shaike Ophir; and in Kohav Hashahar (1980) (also 'Morning Star'), a film about life in Yafo featuring Arieh Elias, Noam Kaniel, Asher Tzarfati, Yosef Shiloah, and Arab-Israeli soccer player Rifat Turk.

Television
In 2003, Levy was cast as 'Elvis Ben-David' in the television series Esti Ha'mechoeret (lit. Ugly Esti), an Israeli adaptation of the Mexican telenovela El Amor no es como lo pintan ("Love is not as they paint it"). His successful and charismatic appearance promoted further productions that were based on his Elvis character: Elvis, Rosental, VeHaIsha Hamistorit (2005) (lit. Elvis, Rosenthal, and the Mystery Woman) and Elvis (2006). During this period Levi came out with a solo stage act titled Yeshayahu Chapter 2 (in 2005).

In 2007, Levy participated in a children's musical tape – Bamboni Ein Kamoni. In an interview for Maariv's internet site nrg he jokingly noted that this performance to a very young crowd is a long term investment and that in 20 years they would be the people who would purchase tickets to his shows.

Shaike Levy and fellow "Gashash" Gavri Banai were enlisted for the second season of the television show Hakol Dvash (lit. "Everything is Honey"). The show, which included the third "Gashash", Yisrael Poliakov, has gained critical acclaim for its first season but also saw the passing away of both Poliakov and Shosh Atari, who portrayed the parents of the show's creator-writer, Yael Polyakov, the real-life daughter of Yisrael.

Awards and recognition 
In 2000, after close to 40 years of performing together, the Gashash HaHiver, alongside its three individual members, Levy, Gavri Banai, and Yisrael Poliakov, were together awarded the Israel Prize for lifetime achievement and contribution to society and the State of Israel. 
Among the contributors to the "Gashash" success were the trio's producer (Avraham Pashanel) and directors (Shaike Ophir, Nisim Aloni, Yossi Banai, and Moti Kirschenbaum), as well as musical directors (Arie Levanon and after him Itshak Garciani) and content contributors (Music: Yair Rosenblum, Kobi Oshrat, Ariel Zilber, Mati Caspi, and Naomi Shemer; Writers: Shaike Ophir, Nisim Aloni, Yossi Banai, Moti Kirschenbaum, Danni Reve, and Yonatan Geffen).

From the thousands of "Gashash" shows, Levi recalls one at Carnegie Hall that received warm reviews in the New York Times as well as a certain performance in front of injured soldiers in hospitals where a soldier's mother noted, "Don't laugh. Your sutures will open!" to her son who hadn't smiled or laughed in a while.

Legal issues
Levi has been in conflict with the Israel Broadcasting Authority over high per-minute payment demands by Israel's public Channel 1 for airing HaGashash HaHiver early recordings. Levi notes that in those days it was the only channel and they would perform there for free on the condition that it was a single-use recording. Noting a document ratifying his statement to Moshe Gavish (chair of the authority) – signed by various relevant television managers Arnon Zucherman, Moti Kirschenbaum, Rafi Ginat, and others –  Levi demanded that the content be transferred to the "Gashash" members and producer as it was their intellectual property.

Filmography
 Sinaia (1962) - as Enemy Pilot
 Sallah Shabati (1964) - as Shimon Shabati
 Moishe Ventilator (1966)
 Fortuna (1966)
 Ervinka (1967) - as Friedrich
 HaShehuna Shelanu (1968)
 HaMatara Tiran (1968)
 Kol Mamzer Melekh (1968)
 Hitromamut (1970)
 Givat Halfon Eina Ona (1976) - as Mr. Hasson
 Hamesh Meot Ellef Shachor (1977)
 Shlager** (1979)
 Kohav Hashahar (1980)
 HaKrav Al HaVa'ad (1986)
 Esti Ha'mechoeret** (TV series, 2003) - as Elvis Ben-David
 Elvis, Rosental, VeHaIsha Hamistorit** (TV series, 2005) - as Elvis Ben David
 Elvis** (TV series, 2006) - as Elvis Ben David
** also a performer on the soundtrack.

Notable stage acts
 HaTarnegolim (1960–1963)
 HaGashash HaHiver (1963–2000)
 Yeshayahu Chapter 2 (2005)

HaGashash HaHiver shows
 "Simhat Zkenti" (Nov. 1964) Directed by Shaike Ophir
 "Plan Dalet" (April 1966) Directed by Shaike Ophir
 "Sinema Gashash" (June 1967) Directed by Nisim Aloni
 "Quintette for Shuwarma" (July 1969) Directed by Nisim Aloni
 "Cassius Clay vs. Khalphon" (1971) Directed by Yossi Banai
 "Offside Story" (1974) Directed by Yossi Banai
 "Ovdim Aleinu Avoda Ivrit" (1977) Directed by Yossi Banai
 "Kreker vs. Kreker" (1980) Directed by Yossi Banai
 "Beavur Khoken Dollarim" (1985) Directed by Moti Kirschenbaum (written by Danni Reve)
 "Koson Ruakh" (1991) Directed by Yossi Banai
 "Gashash and goodbye" (2000)

References.

Discography
 Shaike Levi (solo album - 1999)
 Soundtracks and collections by the Gashash Hahiver

Author
 'Sipurim Im Rotev' ( lit. 'Stories With Sauce') (1996)

See also
List of Israel Prize recipients

References

External links
 
 Shaike Levi on Century Guide to the Hebrew Theatre
 Story about Shaike Levy  on 'Tales of Givat Brenner'
 Resume for HaGashash HaHiver, Receivers of the Israeli award for 5760 (Hebrew year), Israeli Ministry of Education.
 Trailer for Kohav Hashahar (1980)

1939 births
Living people
Egyptian Jews
Egyptian emigrants to Mandatory Palestine
Israel Prize for lifetime achievement & special contribution to society recipients
Jewish Israeli comedians
Jewish Israeli male actors
20th-century Israeli Jews
21st-century Israeli Jews
Israeli male comedians
Israeli male film actors
Israeli male stage actors
Israeli male television actors
Israeli people of Egyptian-Jewish descent
20th-century Israeli male actors
21st-century Israeli male actors
20th-century Israeli comedians
21st-century Israeli comedians